Ideas Nuevas (in English, New Ideas) is the second album by the Puerto Rican reggae band, Cultura Profética. Like their first album, it was recorded in Jamaica at Marley Music Studios under the Tuff Gong label. It was released June 19, 2000.

Track listing
 "La Otra Galaxia" - 2:23
Music: Gutiérrez, Cultura Profética
 "Ideas Nuevas" - 6:10
Music: Eliut González, Gutiérrez, CP
 "Suelta los Amarres" - 6:03
Music: Rodríguez, CP
 "Rompiendo el Letargo" - 6:57
Music: Rodríguez, Gutiérrez, CP
 "No Me Busques" - 5:44
Music: Rodríguez, González, CP
 "La Plaga" - 5:23
Lyrics: Boris Bilbraut, Paul Bilbraut
Music: B. Bilbraut, Rodríguez, Gutiérrez, González, CP
 "Mr. Swin' y el Tres Pasitos Jazz Ensemble" - 3:54
Music: Gutiérrez, CP
 "Siento" - 4:47
Lyrics: B. Bilbraut
Music: Rodríguez, CP
 "Soldado" - 7:58
Lyrics: Ivy Andino
Music: Gutiérrez, Rodríguez, González, CP
 "Ley Natural" - 6:20
Music: Rodríguez, Omar Silva, CP
 "Reggae Rústico" - 4:41
Music: Rodríguez, Gutiérrez, CP
 "So Much Trouble" - 3:53
Lyrics: Bob Marley
Music: Bob Marley and the Wailers
Arrangement: Cultura Profética
Additional lyrics: Bernard Satta Collins Abyssinian, Rodríguez
 "Meditación Lunar" - 5:23
Lyrics: Rodríguez, Silva
Music: Gutiérrez, Silva, CP
 "Diario" - 6:13
Music: Rodríguez, Silva, CP

All lyrics written by Willy Rodríguez, except where noted. All winds arrangements by Iván Gutiérrez.

Musicians
 Boris Bilbraut - lead and background vocals, drums, percussion
 Willy Rodríguez - lead and background vocals, bass guitar, funde in "Diario"
 Iván Gutiérrez - piano, hohner clavinet, Moog Source, funde in "Diario"
 Eliut González - guitar, background vocals in "Ideas Nuevas", percussion in "So Much Trouble"
 Omar Silva - electric guitar, classic guitar, Puerto Rican cuatro, percussion in "So Much Trouble"
 Raúl Gaztambide - Oberheim organ, keyboards
 María Soledad Gaztambide - vocals
 Yarimir Cabán - vocals
 Ras Omar Cruz - percussion, Nyabinghi drums
 Eduardo Fernández - trombone
 Luis Rafael Torres - tenor sax, alto sax, flute
 Juan José "Cheo" Quiñones - trumpet, flugelhorn

Additional musicians
 Guillermo Bonetto (from Los Cafres) - vocals in "Suelta los Amarres"
 Bernard Satta Collins Abyssinian - vocals in "So Much Trouble"
 Uziah "Sticky" Tompson - funde in "Diario"
 Harry T. Powell - bass drum and repeater in "Diario"

Production
 Produced by Willy Rodríguez, Iván Gutiérrez, Omar Silva, Eliut González, Boris Bilbraut
 Executive producer - Raúl "Tusti" López and José "Pepe" Dueño

Recording
 Recorded at Marley Music and Tuff Gong Studios in Kingston, Jamaica
 Recording engineer - Errol Brown, Iván Gutiérrez, Shane Brown
 Recording assistants - Alrick Thompson, Roland McDermott, Christopher Miller, Claude Squire
 Mix engineer - Errol Brown
 Mixed by Errol Brown and Iván Gutiérrez
 Mastered at Fuller Sound, Miami, by Rob Fuller
 Photography by Carlos Manuel García
 Art direction and design - Kacho López Mari

References

2001 albums